"Kiss Like the Sun" is a song recorded by English musician, singer, and songwriter Jake Bugg. It was released as a digital download and for streaming on 14 November 2019. The song was written by Ali Tamposi, Andrew Wotman, Brian D Lee and Jake Bugg.

Background
On 12 November 2019, the song was selected as by BBC Radio 1's Annie Mac as her Hottest Record. Talking about the song, Bugg said, "I love working with Andrew Watt and I'm really pleased with the sound of this track. I wanted to write something that was fun and a bit light-hearted."

Music video
A music video to accompany the release of "Kiss Like the Sun" was first released onto YouTube on 17 January 2020.

Track listing

Personnel
Credits adapted from Tidal.
 Andrew Watt – Producer, all instruments, guitar, keyboards, programmer
 Ali Tamposi – Composer, lyricist
 Andrew Wotman – Composer, lyricist
 Brian D Lee – Composer, lyricist
 Jake Bugg – Composer, lyricist, associated performer, vocal
 Happy Perez – All Instruments, assistant engineer, guitar, keyboards, programmer
 Michael Freeman – Engineer
 Paul Lamalfa – Engineer
 Dave Kutch – Mastering Engineer
 Mark Stent – Mixing Engineer

Charts

Release history

References

Songs about kissing
2019 songs
2019 singles
Jake Bugg songs
Sony Music singles